Peter Bodkin (15 September 1924 – 18 September 1994) was an English cricketer. He played nine first-class matches for Cambridge University Cricket Club in 1946.

See also
 List of Cambridge University Cricket Club players

References

External links
 

1924 births
1994 deaths
English cricketers
Cambridge University cricketers
People from the London Borough of Barnet
Hertfordshire cricketers